Chaand Raat is a South Asia location, used for the eve of the Muslim festival of Eid ul-Fitr; it can also mean a night with a new moon for the new Islamic month Shawwal. Chaand Raat is a time of celebration when families and friends gather in open areas at the end of the last day of Ramadan to spot the new moon, which signals the arrival of the Islamic month of Shawwal and the day of Eid. Once the moon is sighted, people wish each other Chaand Raat Mubarak ("Have a blessed night of the new moon") or Eid Mubarak ("Blessings of the Eid day"). Women and girls decorate their hands with mehndi (henna), and people prepare desserts for the next day of Eid and do last rounds of shopping. City streets have a festive look, and brightly decorated malls and markets remain open late into the night. Chaand Raat is celebrated festively and passionately by Muslims (and occasionally non-Muslims as well) all over South Asia, and in socio-cultural significance, is comparable to Christmas Eve.

Etymology

The term is derived from the Hindustani chānd rāt, literally translating to 'moon night'. The two words in the term are derived from the Sanskrit words candrá (चंद्र) "moon" and rā́tri (रात्रि) "night", respectively.

Background
Chaand Raat celebrations occur on the eve of Eid ul-Fitr, which is celebrated on 1 Shawwal. The beginning of an Islamic month depends on the first sighting of the lunar crescent and thus the month of Ramadan can be of either 29 or 30 days. Chaand Raat occurs on the same evening on which first lunar crescent of the month of Shawwal is observed. As the exact day of Eid ul-Fitr is dependent on the moon sighting, Chaand Raat is often considered more festive on Eid ul-Fitr than Eid ul-Adha, which is known well in advance.

Festivities

Once the new moon is sighted, announcements are made from mosques, television channels and radio stations. Festivities begin almost instantly and continue all night until the morning Fajr prayer. Entire families head out towards the local bazaars, markets and shopping malls. Shoppers usually purchase last-minute items for Eid, such as shalwar kameez, bangles, jewelry, bags, and shoes. Gifts and sweets are brought for friends while toys are brought for children. Barber shops and beauty parlors are also heavily visited in the evening in preparation for the following day.  At home, women and girls decorate their hands with mehndi. People also decorate their homes and begin preparing food for the holiday. Decorative lights are put up in markets as well as government buildings, banks and mosques. Chaand Raat also gives a chance for people to meet with friends and extended family.

See also
 Festivals in Pakistan
 Ruet-e-Hilal Committee

References

External links
Official Chand Raat in Australia 
Official Chand Raat Mela in Virginia 
Moon sighting curves

Fasting in Islam
Festivals of Bangladeshi culture
Festivals in India
Festivals in Pakistan
Eid (Islam)
Ramadan
Islamic terminology